The Susquehanna Valley is a region of low-lying land that borders the Susquehanna River in the U.S. states of New York, Pennsylvania, and Maryland.  The valley consists of areas that lie along the main branch of the river, which flows from Upstate New York through Pennsylvania and Maryland into the Chesapeake Bay, as well as areas that lie along the shorter West Branch in Pennsylvania.

History and architectural features
As of 2014, seventeen of the oldest covered bridges in the United States were located in the Susquehanna Valley.

Geography
Historians and environmentalists at the Chesapeake Conservancy have described the Susquehanna River as the "lifeblood" of the Chesapeake Bay and also as "extension of the Susquehanna Valley that the Atlantic Ocean has steadily flooded over the last 15,000 years."

Within Pennsylvania, the Susquehanna Valley is linked inextricably with the Chesapeake Bay watershed, which extends from Virginia, West Virginia, Washington, D.C. and Maryland through Delaware, Pennsylvania and New York. Pennsylvania's connections to the watershed are "primarily in the counties along the Susquehanna River, the West Branch of the Susquehanna, and their tributaries," according to Shelby Splain. "Located in the middle of the commonwealth, about half of the land in Pennsylvania drains into it."

Communities in the valley

Main Branch

Cities
 Oneonta, New York
 Binghamton, New York
 Wilkes-Barre, Pennsylvania
 Scranton, Pennsylvania
 Sunbury, Pennsylvania
 Harrisburg, Pennsylvania
 Lancaster, Pennsylvania
 York, Pennsylvania
 Havre de Grace, Maryland

Counties

 Otsego County, New York
 Delaware County, New York
 Chenango County, New York
 Broome County, New York
 Susquehanna County, Pennsylvania
 Tioga County, New York
 Bradford County, Pennsylvania
 Wyoming County, Pennsylvania
 Lackawanna County, Pennsylvania
 Luzerne County, Pennsylvania
 Columbia County, Pennsylvania
 Montour County, Pennsylvania
 Potter County, Pennsylvania
 Tioga County, Pennsylvania
 Northumberland County, Pennsylvania
 Snyder County, Pennsylvania
 Juniata County, Pennsylvania
 Perry County, Pennsylvania
 Dauphin County, Pennsylvania
 Cumberland County, Pennsylvania
 York County, Pennsylvania
 Lancaster County, Pennsylvania
 Cecil County, Maryland
 Harford County, Maryland

West Branch

Cities
 Lock Haven, Pennsylvania
 Williamsport, Pennsylvania

Counties
 Cambria County, Pennsylvania
 Clearfield County, Pennsylvania
 Centre County, Pennsylvania
 Clinton County, Pennsylvania
 Lycoming County, Pennsylvania
 Union County, Pennsylvania
 Northumberland County, Pennsylvania

References

External links
Barrett, Brenda and Jackie Kramer. "Contact Period Landscapes of the Lower Susquehanna River." Annapolis, Maryland: NPS Chesapeake Bay Office, National Park Service, 2016 (retrieved online February 4, 2023).
"Indigenous Peoples of the Susquehanna Valley." The Historical Marker Database, retrieved online February 4, 2023.

 
Landforms of Cambria County, Pennsylvania
Landforms of Clearfield County, Pennsylvania
Landforms of Centre County, Pennsylvania
Landforms of Clinton County, Pennsylvania
Landforms of Lycoming County, Pennsylvania
Landforms of Northumberland County, Pennsylvania
Landforms of Union County, Pennsylvania
River valleys of the United States
Susquehanna River
Valleys of Maryland
Valleys of New York (state)
Valleys of Pennsylvania